Anbarteh-e Sofla (also Romanized as Anbārteh-e Soflá; also known as Anbārteh and Amārateh-ye Soflá) is a village in Mirbag-e Jonubi Rural District, in the Central District of Delfan County, Lorestan Province, Iran. At the 2006 census, its population was 43, in 6 families.

References 

Towns and villages in Delfan County